Gyromitra infula, commonly known as the hooded false morel or the elfin saddle, is a fungus in the family Helvellaceae. The dark reddish-brown caps of the fruit bodies develop a characteristic saddle-shape in maturity, and the ends of both saddle lobes are drawn out to sharp tips that project above the level of the fruit body. The stipe is white or flushed pale brown, smooth on the outside, but hollow with some chambers inside. It is found in the Northern Hemisphere, usually in the late summer and autumn, growing on rotting wood or on hard packed ground. G. infula is considered inedible as it contains the toxic compound gyromitrin which, when metabolized by the body, is converted into monomethylhydrazine, a component of some rocket fuels. The toxin may be removed by thorough cooking. Gyromitra fungi are included in the informal category "false morels".

Taxonomy

The fungus was first described in 1774 by German mycologist Jacob Christian Schäffer as Helvella infula (the original genus spelling was Elvela). In 1849, Elias Magnus Fries established the genus Gyromitra, distinguishing it from Helvella based on a gyrose hymenium (marked with wavy lines or convolutions); the genus was based on the type species Gyromitra esculenta.  Later, in 1886, French mycologist Lucien Quélet transferred the species to Gyromitra. The next few decades witnessed some lingering confusion as to the correct taxonomical placement of these fungi. In 1907, Jean Boudier moved both G. esculenta and H. infula into a newly created genus he called Physomitra; he retained the genus Gyromitra but "based it on an entirely different character so as to exclude from the genus the very species on which it was founded". In an attempt to reconcile the confusion surrounding the naming and identity of the two mushrooms, Fred J. Seaver proposed that both were synonymous, representing variable forms of the same species. His suggestion was not adopted by later mycologists, who identified various differences between the two species, including fruiting time as well as macroscopic and microscopic differences.

It is known more commonly as the elfin saddle or the hooded false morel. Additionally, G. infula is a member of a group of fungi collectively known as "false morels", so named for their resemblance to the highly regarded edible true morels of the genus Morchella. This group includes other species of the genus Gyromitra, such as G. esculenta (brain mushroom), G. caroliniana (beefsteak mushroom) and G. gigas (snow morel).

Description

It frequently develops blackish-brown spots on the surface. During the development of the mushroom, the periphery of the cap grows into the stipe below, to form a hollow, roughly bell-shaped structure with the fertile spore-bearing surface (the hymenium) on the outside; as the surface growth of the hymenium continues to expand even after joining to the stipe, the hymenium can no longer follow and it arches up into folds and pads. The stipe is minutely tomentose – covered with a layer of very fine hairs. The context is thin (1–2 mm) and brittle. G. infula does not have any appreciable odor or taste.

Microscopic characteristics

Ascospores are ellipsoidal in shape, hyaline, smooth, thin-walled, with dimensions of 17–22 by 7–9 µm. They are also biguttulate, containing two large oil droplets at either end. The spore-producing cells, the asci, are roughly cylindrical, eight-spored, operculate (opening by an apical lid to discharge the spores) and have dimensions of 200–350 by 12–17 |µm. The diameter of the club-shaped paraphyses is 7–10 µm at the apex.

Edibility

This fungus is inedible, as it contains the toxic compound gyromitrin, which when digested is metabolized into monomethylhydrazine, a major component of rocket fuel. Although much of the gyromitrin may be removed by parboiling with generous volumes of water, consumption is not advisable due to possible long-term health effects. There is evidence that even small doses of gyromitrin may have a cumulative carcinogenic effect.

Similar species

Gyromitra esculenta has a wrinkled surface (similar to brainlike convolutions), not wavy or bumpy like G. infula. Gyromitra ambigua is very similar in appearance, and although it is usually not possible to discern between the two species without examining microscopic characteristics, G. ambigua is said to have more pronounced purple tints in the stipe. G. ambigua has larger spores that are about 22–30 µm long. The saddle-shaped cap of G. infula might also lead to confusion with some species of Helvella, but these latter fungi typically have grayer colors and thinner, fluted stipes.

Habitat and distribution

This fungus can be found growing singly to scattered in or near coniferous woodland in autumn, often on rotten wood. It is also commonly found on packed ground, such as beside country roads, or in campgrounds. Associated conifers include Picea glauca, Picea mariana, Picea sitchensis, Pinus contorta, Pinus banksiana, Pinus monticola, Abies balsamea, Abies grandis, Pseudotsuga menziesii, Tsuga heterophylla, Larix occidentalis, Thuja plicata, as well as the deciduous tree species Populus balsamifera, Populus tremuloides, Acer macrophyllum, Alnus species, and Betula papyrifera.

Gyromitra infula is widely distributed throughout boreal, montane and coastal forests in North America. The North American range extends north to Canada and south to Mexico. It has also been reported from South America, Europe, and Asia.

References

External links

Mushroom Observer Photographs

Discinaceae
Inedible fungi
Fungi described in 1774
Fungi of Europe
Fungi of North America
Fungi of South America
Fungi of Asia
Taxa named by Jacob Christian Schäffer